Johanna Clementina Hudig, also known as Han Hudig (Groningen, 27 March 1907 - Amersfoort, 29 July 1996) was the first female judge in the Netherlands. From 1947 to 1977, she was a juvenile judge attached to the Rotterdam court. From 1957 to 1972, she was attached to the University of Utrecht as extraordinary professor of children's rights and child protection.

References 

1907 births
1996 deaths
20th-century Dutch judges
Dutch women lawyers
People from Groningen (city)
Academic staff of Utrecht University